Shona Mary Gilchrist (born 8 October 1958) is a New Zealand former  cricketer who played as a right-arm medium bowler. She appeared in 5 Test matches and 8 One Day Internationals for New Zealand in 1984 and 1985. She played domestic cricket for Otago and Auckland.

References

External links

1958 births
Living people
Cricketers from Dunedin
New Zealand women cricketers
New Zealand women Test cricketers
New Zealand women One Day International cricketers
Otago Sparks cricketers
Auckland Hearts cricketers